Robert Fröhle is an Austrian para-alpine skier. He represented Austria at the Winter Paralympics in 2002, 2006 and 2010.

In 2006 he won one bronze medal in the Men's Super-G Sitting event.

Achievements

See also 
 List of Paralympic medalists in alpine skiing

References 

1982 births
Alpine skiers at the 2002 Winter Paralympics
Alpine skiers at the 2006 Winter Paralympics
Alpine skiers at the 2010 Winter Paralympics
Paralympic bronze medalists for Austria
Medalists at the 2006 Winter Paralympics
Living people
Place of birth missing (living people)
Austrian male alpine skiers
Paralympic medalists in alpine skiing
Paralympic alpine skiers of Austria
21st-century Austrian people